Alakhapura Bogan is a village and panchayat in Lachhmangarh tehsil, Sikar district, Rajasthan, India. The word "Bogan" represents the Sufi sant Bogan Peer who is worshiped by both Hindus and Muslims. The dominant caste in the village is Jat. In jats Dhaka clan is the most prominent one, the other clans are Sevada, Khyalia and Mahala. In Dhakas the descendants of Khadta Ram are notables.

Alakhpura Bogan is a village and Panchayat that is situated in Sikar district near Laxmangarh. The word "Bogan" represents the Sufi sant "Bogan Peer" who is worshipped by both Hindus and Muslims.

Distance from Laxmangarh to Alakhpura Bogan is only 13 km.by road. Alakhpura Bogan is 30 km from its District Main City Sikar, and 130 km from its State Main City Jaipur.
Nearby villages are Bhuma Bara (2.3 km), Patoda (4.5 km), Bhojasar Bara (5.1 km), Bathoth (7.8 km), Badusar (7.9 km).

References

Villages in Sikar district